Chulio is an unincorporated community in Floyd County, in the U.S. state of Georgia.

History
A post office called Chulio was established in 1878, and remained in operation until it was discontinued in 1901. The community was named for Chulioa, a Cherokee Indian.

References

Unincorporated communities in Floyd County, Georgia
Unincorporated communities in Georgia (U.S. state)